Hezekiah G. Spruill (September 8, 1808 – June 20, 1874), was the mayor of and a planter in Plymouth in Washington County, North Carolina, during the American Civil War. He had been appointed in 1832 as General of the Militia for the troops of the Albemarle Region of North Carolina.  In April 1861, Spruill organized the local troops to prepare for the beginning of the Civil War.

Spruill was married to Anne Louise Garrett Spruill.  They are buried in Grace Churchyard, Plymouth, North Carolina.

See also

References
 Durrill, Wayne K., War of Another Kind: A Southern Community in the Great Rebellion. Oxford: Oxford University Press, 1994.. 
 Web page on General Spruill

1808 births
1874 deaths
People of North Carolina in the American Civil War
American militia generals
People from Plymouth, North Carolina